Fortunio Affaitati (1510–1550) was an  Italian  physicist and astrologer.

He was born to the aristocratic Affaitati family in Cremona, and dedicated to Pope Paul III a series of essays titled Phisicae ac astronomicae considerationes (1549). He retired to live in England.

References

External links 
 

1510 births
1550 deaths
16th-century Italian physicians
Italian astrologers